In formal semantics, the squiggle operator  is an operator which constrains the occurrence of focus. The squiggle was first introduced by Mats Rooth in 1992 as part of his treatment of focus within the framework of alternative semantics. It has become one of the standard tools in formal work on focus, playing a key role in accounts of contrastive focus, ellipsis, deaccenting, and question-answer congruence.

Empirical motivation

The empirical motivation for the squiggle operator comes from cases where focus marking requires a salient antecedent in discourse which stands in some particular relation with the focused expression. For instance, the following pairs shows that contrastive focus is only felicitous when there is a salient focus antecedent which contrasts with the focused expression (capital letters indicate the focused expression).

 (Helen likes stroopwafel) No, MANDY likes stroopwafel.
 (Helen likes stroopwafel) #No, Mandy likes STROOPWAFEL.

 An AMERICAN farmer was talking to a CANADIAN farmer.
 ?? An AMERICAN farmer was talking to a Canadian FARMER.

Another instance of this phenomenon is question-answer congruence, also known as answer focus. Informally, a focused constituent in an answer to a question must represent the part of the utterance which resolves the issue raised by the question. For instance, the following pair of dialogues show that in response to a question of who likes stroopwafel, focus must be placed on the name of the person who likes stroopwafel. When focus is instead placed on the word "stroopwafel" itself, the answer is infelicitous, as indicated by the # sign.

 Q: Who likes stroopwafel?  A: HELEN likes stroopwafel.
 Q: Who likes stroopwafel?  A: #Helen likes STROOPWAFEL.

If instead the question is what Helen likes, the word "stroopwafel" will be the expression which resolves the issue. Thus, focus will belong on "stroopwaffel" instead of "Helen".

 Q: What does Helen like?  A: #HELEN likes stroopwafel.
 Q: What does Helen like?  A: Helen likes STROOPWAFEL.

Formal details

In the Roothian Squiggle Theory,  is what requires a focused expression to have a suitable focus antecedent. In doing so, it also allows the focus denotation and the ordinary denotation to interact. In the alternative Semantics approach to focus, each constituent  has both an ordinary denotation  and a focus denotation  which are composed by parallel computations. The focus denotation of a constituent is typically the set of all ordinary denotations one could get by substituting a focused constituent for another expression of the same type.

Sentence: HELEN likes stroopwafel.
Ordinary denotation: 
Focus denotation: 

Sentence: Helen likes STROOPWAFEL.
Ordinary denotation: 
Focus denotation: 

The squiggle operator takes two arguments, a contextually provided antecedent  and an overt argument . In the above examples,  is a variable which can be valued as 's focus antecedent, while  itself could be the constituent [HELEN likes stroopwafel].

If this presupposition is satisfied,  passes along its overt argument's ordinary denotation while "resetting" its focus denotation.

See also

 Alternative semantics
 Focus (linguistics)
 Givenness
 Question

Notes

Pragmatics
Semantics